Greyfriars, Shrewsbury was a friary in Shropshire, England.

Owen de la Pole (c. 1257 – c. 1293), also known as Owain ap Gruffydd ap Gwenwynwyn, the last Prince of Powys,  was buried here, as was his daughter  Hawise Gadarn (the Hardy), her husband John Charleton, 1st Baron Cherleton, and Owen's father Gruffydd ap Gwenwynwyn

References

Monasteries in Shropshire
Roman Catholic churches in Shropshire
Churches in Shrewsbury
Burial sites of the House of Mathrafal